Yuliya Vitaliïvna Dovhal (born June 2, 1983 in Kirovohrad) is a Ukrainian-Azerbaijani weightlifter.

Career
Dovhal represented Ukraine at the 2008 Summer Olympics in Beijing, where she competed for the women's super heavyweight category (+75 kg), along with her compatriot Olha Korobka, who eventually won the silver medal. Dovhal placed seventh in this event, as she successfully lifted 118 kg in the single-motion snatch, and hoisted 140 kg in the two-part, shoulder-to-overhead clean and jerk, for a total of 258 kg.

References

External links
 
NBC 2008 Olympics profile

1983 births
Living people
Ukrainian female weightlifters
Azerbaijani female weightlifters
Olympic weightlifters of Ukraine
Weightlifters at the 2008 Summer Olympics
Sportspeople from Kropyvnytskyi
Ukrainian emigrants to Azerbaijan
Naturalized citizens of Azerbaijan